Charles Francis Bishop (August 2, 1888 – February 1, 1954) was a United States Navy sailor received the Medal of Honor for actions on board the  during the Veracruz Campaign.

Biography
Charles F. Bishop was born in Pittsburgh, Pennsylvania.  He joined the U.S. Navy and by the time of the Vera Cruz expedition in 1914 was a Quartermaster Second Class assigned the battleship USS Florida.  He was awarded the Medal of Honor in June 1915.  He remained in the Navy and rose to the rank of commander.

He is buried in the Fort Rosecrans National Cemetery in San Diego, California.

Medal of Honor citation
Rank and organization: Quartermaster Second Class, U.S. Navy. Born: August 2, 1888, Pittsburgh, Pa. Accredited to: Pennsylvania. G.O. No.: 101, June 15, 1914.

Citation:

On board the U.S.S. Florida for extraordinary heroism in the line of his profession during the seizure of Vera Cruz, Mexico, April 21, 1914.

See also

List of Medal of Honor recipients (Veracruz)

Notes

References

United States Navy Medal of Honor recipients
United States Navy sailors
People from San Diego
1888 births
1954 deaths
Burials at Fort Rosecrans National Cemetery
Battle of Veracruz (1914) recipients of the Medal of Honor
Military personnel from Pittsburgh